Courcy-Brimont station (French: Gare de Courcy-Brimont ) is a railway station in the commune of Courcy, Marne department, northern France. The station also serves the nearby commune of Brimont. It is at kilometric point (KP) 8.443 on the Reims-Laon railway served by TER Grand Est trains operated by the SNCF.

In 2018, the SNCF estimated that 18,016 passengers travelled through the station.

References 

Railway stations in Marne (department)